AMTC may refer to:

 Applied Media Technologies Corporation, an American media company
 Allied Maritime Transport Council, an agency of the allied powers during World War I